Budureasa is a commune in Bihor County, Crișana, Romania with a population of 2,581 people. It is composed of five villages: Budureasa, Burda (Borda), Saca (Száka), Săliște de Beiuș (Belényesszeleste) and Teleac (Telek).

The Stâna de Vale resort is located in the commune.

References

Budureasa
Localities in Crișana